Eugnosta caracana is a species of moth of the family Tortricidae. It is found in Brazil (Minas Gerais).

The wingspan is 15–16 mm. The ground colour is creamy ochreous with ochreous yellow shades, silvery spots and blackish microstrigulae. The hindwings are brown.

References

Moths described in 2002
Eugnosta